Friedrich Wilhelm Birnstiel was an 18th-century German music publisher known for publishing two volumes of four-part chorales by Johann Sebastian Bach in the 1760s.

Publications

Friedrich Wilhelm Birnstiel was active as a publisher and editor of music between 1753 and 1782.

Oden mit Melodien
Oden mit Melodien (odes with melodies) was published in two volumes:
 Vol. 1 (1753, reprinted 1761)
 Vol. 2 (1755)
The volumes contained works by Johann Friedrich Agricola, Carl Philipp Emanuel Bach, Johann Christian Bach, Franz Benda, Carl Friedrich Christian Fasch, Johann Gottlieb Graun, Carl Heinrich Graun, Johann Philipp Kirnberger, Christian Gottfried Krause, Friedrich Wilhelm Marpurg, Christoph Nichelmann and Johann Joachim Quantz.

Libretto of Graun's Der Tod Jesu cantata

In 1755 Birnstiel published Karl Wilhelm Ramler's libretto of Carl Heinrich Graun's cantata Der Tod Jesu. The music of this Passion setting was published five years later by Johann Gottlob Immanuel Breitkopf.

Kritische Briefe über die Tonkunst
The  (critical letters about musical composition) were published from 1759 to 1764, edited by Friedrich Wilhelm Marpurg, who was also the author of most of the letters in this collection. They were published in three volumes:
 Vol. 1, in four parts (letters 1–64, 1760).
 Vol. 2, in four parts (letters 65–128, 1763).
 Vol. 3, one part (letters 129–143, 1764).

Musikalisches Allerley

Musikalisches Allerley von verschiedenen Tonkünstlern (musical miscellaneous by various composers):
 Vol. 1 (instalments 1–6, 1760, and instalment 7, 1761)
 Vol. 2 (instalments 9–16, 1761)
 Vol. 3 (instalments 17–24, 1761)
 Vol. 4 (instalments 25–32, 1761)
 Vol. 5 (instalments 33–40, 1761)
 Vol. 6 (instalments 41–45, 1761, and instalments 46–48, 1762)
 Vol. 7 (instalments 49–56, 1762)
 Vol. 8 (instalments 57–64, 1763)
 Vol. 9 (instalments 65–72, 1763)
Contains compositions by, among others, Johann Friedrich Agricola, Carl Philipp Emanuel Bach, Jean-François Dandrieu, Carl Friedrich Christian Fasch, Carl Heinrich Graun, August Bernhard Valentin Herbing, Johann Gottlieb Janitsch, Johann Philipp Kirnberger, Christian Gottfried Krause, Friedrich Wilhelm Marpurg, Christoph Nichelmann, Johann Joachim Quantz, Jean-Philippe Rameau, Friedrich Wilhelm Riedt, Johann Heinrich Rolle, Gottfried Heinrich Stölzel, Georg Christoph Wagenseil, .

Johann Philipp Kirnbergers Clavierübungen mit der Bachischen Applicatur
Johann Philipp Kirnbergers Clavierübungen mit der Bachischen Applicatur were published in four volumes from 1761 to 1766:
 Vol. 1 (1761).
 Vol. 2 (1762).
 Vol. 3 (1763).
 Vol. 4 (1766).

Descriptions of painting collections
Descriptions of painting collections, both published in 1763:
 Des Herrn Daniel Stenglin in Hamburg Sammlung von italienischen, holländischen und deutschen Gemählden by Matthias Oesterreich.

Kirnberger's Construction der gleichschwebenden Temperatur
Kirnberger's Construction der gleichschwebenden Temperatur was published in 1764.

Kleine Sing- und Spielstücke fürs Clavier
The Kleine Sing- und Spielstücke fürs Clavier von verschiedenen Meistern volumes contained mostly material that had already been published before, for instance as examples in Marpurg's Kritische Briefe:
 Vol. 1 (1764)
 Vol. 2 (1764)
 Vol. 3 (1766)

Johann Sebastian Bachs vierstimmige Choralgesänge

The first volume of Johann Sebastian Bachs vierstimmige Choralgesänge was published in 1765, and the second volume in 1769. Each volume contained 100 chorale harmonisations, most of them by Johann Sebastian Bach.

Adlung's Musica mechanica organoedi and Musikalisches Siebengestirn
Jakob Adlung's Musica mechanica organoedi and Musikalisches Siebengestirn were published in 1768.

Berlinisches litterarisches Wochenblatt
Editions of the Berlinisches litterarisches Wochenblatt (Berlin literary weekly) were grouped in volumes:
 1776, 2 volumes.
 1777, 2 volumes.

Müller's Drey Sonaten for keyboard duet

References

Sources

External links
 

18th-century publishers (people)
German music publishers (people)